Teleolophus is an extinct genus of herbivorous mammals related to tapirs that flourished in the Eocene of Asia.

References

Eocene odd-toed ungulates
Eocene mammals of Asia
Fossil taxa described in 1925